"Going Underground" is a single by English rock band the Jam, released in March 1980. It debuted at number one in the UK Singles Chart, spending three weeks at the top. "Going Underground" was the first of four number one singles the band were to achieve throughout their career.

Song profile
"Going Underground" was not released on any of the band's six studio albums, although it has appeared on many compilations and re-releases since the 1980s. The song was released as a double A-side with "Dreams of Children", which originally had been intended to be the sole A-side; following a mix-up at the pressing plant, the single became a double A-side, and DJs tended to choose the more melodic "Going Underground" to play on the radio. The song covers social issues of the time such as political corruption, voter apathy and Thatcherism.

It was the 15th best-selling single in the UK in 1980. The song was ranked at number 2 among the "Tracks of the Year" for 1980 by NME. In March 2005, Q magazine placed "Going Underground" at number 73 in its list of the 100 Greatest Guitar Tracks, and in October 2006, placed it at number 98 in its list of the 100 Greatest Songs Ever.

"Dreams of Children"

"Going Underground" was coupled with "Dreams of Children" as a double A-side. It opens and is intermittently accentuated with a backmasked sample of the band's 1979 song "Thick as Thieves". In the US the backwards intro was edited out making the single 10 seconds shorter than the UK Version. This US edit is available on the best-of compilation Snap!.

Certifications

Covers and parodies
Comedy band Amateur Transplants released a two-minute parody titled "London Underground" in 2005 in the light of the December strike. It became a popular download in the United Kingdom.

The song was covered by Buffalo Tom for the 1999 Jam tribute album Fire and Skill: The Songs of the Jam. This version also was released as part of a double A-side single with Liam Gallagher's and Steve Cradock's version of "Carnation" and reached number 6 in the UK Singles Chart.

References

1979 songs
1980 singles
The Jam songs
UK Singles Chart number-one singles
Songs written by Paul Weller
Political songs
Protest songs
Song recordings produced by Vic Coppersmith-Heaven
Polydor Records singles
British hard rock songs